The 2022 IBU Open European Championships were held from 26 to 30 January 2022 at the Hohenzollern Ski Stadium at the Großer Arbersee, Germany.

Schedule
All times are local (UTC+1).

Results

Men's

Women's

Mixed

Medal table

References

External links
Official website

2022
2022 in biathlon
2022 in German sport
International sports competitions hosted by Germany
Biathlon competitions in Germany
IBU